Mouse variety may refer to:

 A fancy mouse variety, as kept as a pet
 A laboratory mouse strain or stock, as used in science
 A species in any mouse subgenus, as found in nature

See also 
 Mouse (disambiguation)
 Rat variety (disambiguation)